Antonio Santos Sánchez Saavedra (born 19 September 1998) is a Mexican professional footballer who plays as a left-back.

Honours
Cruz Azul
Copa MX: Apertura 2018

Notes

References

External links

Living people
1998 births
Mexican footballers
Association football fullbacks
Leones Negros UdeG footballers
Cruz Azul footballers
Alebrijes de Oaxaca players
Ascenso MX players
Liga Premier de México players
Tercera División de México players
Footballers from Guadalajara, Jalisco